The 1970–71 Texaco Cup was the first edition of the tournament sponsored by Texaco. It was won by Wolverhampton Wanderers, who beat Hearts in a two-legged final by 3–2 on aggregate.

First round 1st leg

First round 2nd leg

Quarter-finals 1st leg

Quarter-finals 2nd leg

Semi-finals 1st leg

Semi-finals 2nd leg

Final 1st leg

Final 2nd leg

Notes and references

1970–71 in English football
1970–71 in Scottish football
England–Scotland relations